The Birmingham Indoor Grand Prix, formerly known as Aviva Indoor Grand Prix, is an annual indoor track and field competition which is held in mid-February at the Arena Birmingham in Birmingham, England. It is one of a handful of events to hold IAAF Indoor Permit Meetings status. As one of the later major meetings of the indoor athletics season, it often serves as preparation for the biennial European Athletics Indoor Championships and IAAF World Indoor Championships. The meeting is directed by former athlete Ian Stewart and attracts numerous high calibre athletes including World and Olympic medallists.

The event is one of three indoor athletics competitions in the United Kingdom which are sponsored by Müller, alongside the Müller Birmingham Grand Prix and the Müller Anniversary Games in London. The Müller Indoor Grand Prix was previously known as the Norwich Union Indoor Grand Prix prior to the sponsor's rebranding as Aviva in 2009.

In 2016 the meeting was staged at the Emirates Arena under new sponsorship (Sainsbury's) in Glasgow instead of Birmingham. The 2016 edition was part of the inaugural IAAF World Indoor Tour. The 2017 edition moved back to Birmingham, and venue will alternate in future years.

The Indoor Grand Prix venue has also been used for international level competitions, hosting the 2003 IAAF World Indoor Championships and the 2007 European Athletics Indoor Championships.

World records
Over the course of its history, numerous world records have been set at the Birmingham Indoor Grand Prix.

Meeting records

Men

Women

References

External links

Müller Indoor Grand Prix website from UK Athletics



Annual track and field meetings
Athletics competitions in England
Sport in Birmingham, West Midlands
IAAF Indoor Permit Meetings
Track and field in the United Kingdom
World Athletics Indoor Tour